Sergey Olegovich Sirotkin (born 27 August 1995) is a Russian former professional racing driver who competed in Formula One in  for the Williams team.

Personal life and education 
Sergey Olegovich Sirotkin was born on 27 August 1995 in Moscow, Russia. His father, Oleg Sirotkin, was head of the National Institute of Aviation Technologies, Russia. He graduated from Moscow Automobile and Road Construction University in 2017 with a degree in race car engineering.

Career

Karting
Sirotkin began karting in 2008 and raced in various international series, working his way up from the junior ranks to progress through to the KF3 and KF2 category by 2010.

Formula Abarth
Having turned fifteen years old, Sirotkin graduated to single-seaters, racing in the newly launched Formula Abarth series in Italy for Jenzer Motorsport. He made his début at Vallelunga, finishing the first race in the points and later added four more point-scoring finishes to finish 18th in the championship. Sirotkin remained in Formula Abarth, and with Jenzer, for a second season in 2011; the series splitting into two separate classifications for European and Italian championship races. But prior to the round at Spa, Sirotkin switched to the Euronova Racing by Fortec team. He won the European Series title with a race to spare, taking five wins in fourteen races. In the Italian Series, Sirotkin finished as runner-up with two race victories, losing out to former teammate Patric Niederhauser after an error in the final race at Autodromo Nazionale Monza.

Auto GP World Series
In 2012, Sirotkin continued his collaboration with Euronova Racing into the Auto GP World Series. His first round at Monza saw him qualify on the front row, losing pole position to Adrian Quaife-Hobbs by just 0.04 seconds. He stalled at the start of the first race, but recorded a finish of fourth place in the second race; he also set the fastest lap in both races. At Valencia, he again started behind points leader Quaife-Hobbs, but this time Sirotkin passed him before the first turn, and eventually scored his first win—again setting fastest lap—becoming the youngest Auto GP winner in the process. After another fastest lap in the second race, Sirotkin established a record of four consecutive fastest laps; breaking a record previously held by Romain Grosjean. Sirotkin went on to finish the season in third place overall, behind Quaife-Hobbs and Pål Varhaug. He finished the season with two race wins in Valencia and Sonoma, and seven podium finishes. He also recorded his first pole position at the Marrakech Street Circuit.

Formula Three
Sirotkin also participated in the Italian Formula Three Championship in 2012, driving for Euronova. He recorded two wins at the Hungaroring and Monza, and a further four podium finishes over the course of the season. He also scored points in twenty-two of the twenty-four races—after retiring from the second race at Vallelunga and being disqualified from the third race at Monza—and finished the season fifth overall in both the European and Italian Series championships.

Formula Renault 3.5 Series

Sirotkin made his Formula Renault 3.5 debut in his home event at the Moscow Raceway, partnering fellow Russian driver Nikolay Martsenko at BVM Target. He finished the first race of the meeting in twentieth place, before retiring from the second race.

Sirotkin expanded his Formula Renault 3.5 campaign to contest a full season in 2013, competing with ISR Racing. He had podiums at Alcañiz and Hungaroring with another three-point-scoring finishes to achieve the ninth place in the championship standings.

For 2014 Sirotkin switched to the Fortec Motorsport team and partnered there with Oliver Rowland. He scored his first pole position and won his first Formula Renault 3.5 Series race on his home soil at Moscow Raceway. Despite this, the second Forteс car often broke and he did not finish in 5 races. But whenever he finished a race, he usually did this in points, missing a points finish only once. Overall, he finished 5th in the championship, with 132 points.

GP2 Series
In February 2015, it was announced that Sirotkin would debut in the series with Rapax. He achieved his first victory at Silverstone—a circuit on which he had no previous racing experience—when he won the feature race. During the season he had another four podium finishes. Though a GP2 rookie, Sirotkin finished third in the overall standings.

For the 2016 season, Sirotkin switched to defending champions ART Grand Prix. He had a tough start of the season, as he spun and stalled in the season opener at Barcelona. His problems continued in the Feature race in Monaco, where he had started from pole position but crashed into the wall. Sirotkin converted his pace to race results in Baku with double podium finish in both Feature and Sprint races. At Spielberg he took a pole position but had a poor start and was given a ten-second time penalty for failing to re-establish his original starting position before the safety car line and of failing to re-enter the pitlane. Sirotkin had another double podium finish in the Hungaroring round. He continued to win, repeating success in the feature Hockenheim race. He had technical issues with a car at Monza and Spa-Francorchamps before finishing second in Sepang. He finished third in the final race of the season at Abu Dhabi, tying with Raffaele Marciello in the drivers' standings. Sirotkin was classified third in the standings as he had achieved more wins than Marciello.

FIA Formula 2 Championship
Sirotkin had a one-round return to the wheel of the Dallara GP2/11 car in the 2017 FIA Formula 2 Championship at Baku. He replaced injured Alexander Albon in ART Grand Prix. He finished both races of the round in points.

In 2020 Sirotkin returned to Formula 2 with ART Grand Prix for pre-season testing as a replacement for the quarantined Christian Lundgaard.

Formula One
In July 2013, Sirotkin joined the Sauber Formula One team, with the aim of participating in Friday sessions in 2013 with a view to making his race début, and a full race seat for the  season. He stayed in his role as test driver in 2014. Sirotkin participated in tests that took place in Bahrain on 8 April, where he completed 75 laps and covered a distance of over 300 kilometres, recording the 8th fastest time. This result allowed Sirotkin to get a Superlicence. Sirotkin made his race weekend debut in free practice at the 2014 Russian Grand Prix where he recorded the 17th fastest time, some four-tenths of a second slower than his more experienced teammate Adrian Sutil. Sirotkin was unable to secure a contract with Sauber for 2015 because the team completely changed its structure and selected drivers with good financing.

In April 2016, Sirotkin's Formula One chances were revived when it was announced that he would act as a development driver for the Renault Sport F1 Team and would partake in the first free practice session of the Russian Grand Prix.

He became a reserve driver for 2017, remaining with Renault. He took part in the first free practice sessions during the Russian, Spanish, Austrian and Malaysian Grands Prix and received positive feedback from Renault head Cyril Abiteboul.

Williams (2018)

After the 2017 Abu Dhabi Grand Prix Sirotkin had a half-day test with Williams at the Yas Marina Circuit as the team evaluated potential drivers for the 2018 championship. Sirotkin impressed the team with his driving pace and talent, technical feedback and work ethic. In January 2018, he was announced by Williams as their new driver for the  season as the teammate of Lance Stroll, replacing Felipe Massa, who retired from the sport.

Sirotkin qualified 19th for his first Grand Prix in Australia, but his first F1 race was ended shortly after a sandwich bag got into his Williams car brake system. For the next two races (Bahrain and China) he out-qualified Stroll, but finished just behind him in fifteenth place. He made it into the second qualifying segment for the first time at Baku, qualifying 12th, but his race was ended on the first lap after he was squeezed between Nico Hülkenberg and Fernando Alonso's cars and his car suffered front-left suspension damage. Prior to the accident he also collided with Sergio Pérez which led to the three-place grid penalty on the start of the Spanish Grand Prix. In Spain Sirotkin qualified ahead of Stroll, but lost his place on the grid to him after the penalty was applied. He had a seat problem during the race and was the last driver to cross the finish line. He again out-qualified Stroll at Monaco. Sirotkin passed Stoffel Vandoorne on the first lap but his race was ruined after the mechanics were not able to fit the tyres in time for the 3-minute signal prior start of the race. He received a 10-second stop-and-go penalty for this, finishing the race second last, ahead of Stroll.

The situation with the car remained the same for the triple header (French, Austrian and ), where he was the last man to cross the finish line.

After the summer break, Sirotkin improved his finishing position for two races in a row. At Spa, he finished 12th ahead of Stroll, despite a collision at the start with Valtteri Bottas.

He was forced to make an early pit-stop, and had a long battle with Sergio Pérez, who turned into the Russian driver's car. Due to the damage, his car had problems during braking which led to him blocking Brendon Hartley's car. Sirotkin got a five second time penalty for the blocking and finished last. His home race, the Russian Grand Prix, where he started 13th ahead of Stroll, was ruined after his car was sandwiched between the cars of Carlos Sainz Jr. and Marcus Ericsson, and he finished last again. Sirotkin lost out to Stroll in qualifying for the  but finished one place ahead of him in the race.

In the  the qualifying and race battles with Stroll were won by Sirotkin. While in the  the situation was opposite, with Sirotkin outpaced by Stroll in both qualifying and race. In the  Sirotkin surpassed Stroll again in qualifying and race.

His backer SMP Racing decided to stop their partnership with Williams due to lack of performance and development of the car. In qualifying, he was penultimate, ahead of Stroll. But at the start he lost a position and then had overheating problems, finishing last in the race and in the drivers' championship overall with the only point scored at Monza.

Return as a reserve driver (2019–2020)
In 2019 Sirotkin served as reserve driver for the Formula One teams of both McLaren and Renault. He continued as reserve driver for Renault in 2020.

Sports car racing
Sirotkin raced at the 2017 24 Hours of Le Mans for SMP Racing with Mikhail Aleshin and Viktor Shaytar, finishing 36 laps behind the LMP2 class winner. In 2019 he drove a LMP1-class BR1 together with Stéphane Sarrazin and Egor Orudzhev, the latter crashing mid-race.

In 2020, Sirotkin signed with AF Corse to drive a factory-supported Ferrari 488 GT3 at the GT World Challenge Europe Endurance Cup.

Karting record

Karting career summary

Racing record

Racing career summary

Complete Auto GP World Series results
(key) (Races in bold indicate pole position) (Races in italics indicate fastest lap)

Complete Formula Renault 3.5 Series results
(key) (Races in bold indicate pole position) (Races in italics indicate fastest lap)

 Did not finish, but was classified as he had completed more than 90% of the race distance.

Complete Formula One results
(key) (Races in bold indicate pole position) (Races in italics indicates fastest lap)

Complete GP2 Series results
(key) (Races in bold indicate pole position) (Races in italics indicate fastest lap)

Complete FIA Formula 2 Championship results
(key) (Races in bold indicate pole position) (Races in italics indicate points for the fastest lap of top ten finishers)

24 Hours of Le Mans results

Complete FIA World Endurance Championship results

References

External links

1995 births
Living people
Russian racing drivers
Formula Abarth drivers
Auto GP drivers
Italian Formula Three Championship drivers
World Series Formula V8 3.5 drivers
Sportspeople from Moscow
GP2 Series drivers
24 Hours of Le Mans drivers
FIA Formula 2 Championship drivers
Russian Formula One drivers
Williams Formula One drivers
FIA World Endurance Championship drivers
Jenzer Motorsport drivers
Euronova Racing drivers
BVM Target drivers
ISR Racing drivers
Rapax Team drivers
ART Grand Prix drivers
SMP Racing drivers
AF Corse drivers
Fortec Motorsport drivers
Karting World Championship drivers